Alexis Cardinal River 234 is an Indian reserve of the Alexis Nakota Sioux Nation in Alberta, located within Yellowhead County. It is 73 kilometers southeast of Hinton.

References

Indian reserves in Alberta
Nakoda (Stoney)
Yellowhead County